There were twelve karate events at the 2018 South American Games in Cochabamba, Bolivia. Six for men and six for women. The events were held between May 27 and 29 at the Coliseo Suramericano. The top 2 athletes in each event (minus the host nation Peru, Colombia and Venezuela, whose athletes will qualify through the 2018 Central American and Caribbean Games) qualifying them to compete at the 2019 Pan American Games in Lima, Peru.

Medal summary

Medal table

Men's events

In the 75kg category, Chilean German Antonio qualified as the second eligible athlete for Lima 2019.

Women's events

Athletes in bold have qualified to compete at the 2019 Pan American Games in Lima, Peru. Both Venezuela and Colombia elected to use the 2018 Central American and Caribbean Games as their qualifying event and thus are ineligible to qualify athletes here.

See also
Karate at the 2019 Pan American Games – Qualification

References

2018 South American Games events
South American Games
2018
Qualification tournaments for the 2019 Pan American Games